The Stiftung Wilhelm Lehmbruck Museum - Center for International Sculpture is a museum in Duisburg, Germany. 

Sculptures by Wilhelm Lehmbruck, after whom the museum is named, make up a large part of its collection. However, the museum has a substantial number of works by other 20th-century sculptors, including Ernst Barlach, Käthe Kollwitz, Ludwig Kasper, Hermann Blumenthal, Alexander Archipenko, Raymond Duchamp-Villon, Henri Laurens, Jacques Lipchitz, Alexander Rodtschenko, Laszlo Péri, Naum Gabo, Antoine Pevsner, Pablo Picasso, Salvador Dalí and Max Ernst. This is complemented by a considerable number of paintings by 19th- and 20th-century German artists. The museum circulates its substantial collection by re-installing works on an annual basis.

Selected collection highlights

External links

Lehmbruck Museum within Google Arts & Culture

Art museums and galleries in Germany
Modern art museums in Germany
Buildings and structures in Duisburg
Culture in Duisburg
Museums in North Rhine-Westphalia
Sculpture galleries in Germany